Mumbai Gullies is an upcoming open-world action-adventure video game developed and published by the Indian game developers GameEon Studios. The game was announced at the India Game Developer Conference (IGDC) event in 2020. It is planned to be released for Microsoft Windows through the Steam and Epic Games Store digital distribution platforms.

Gameplay 
The game is played from a third-person perspective, with open world gameplay and controls similar to that of the Grand Theft Auto series. The player can use vehicles like train, cars and auto-rickshaws for freely roaming the game world.

The game map is based on the Indian city of Mumbai and the state of Maharashtra; it reportedly features parts of Mumbai's metropolitan area, including the Bombay Stock Exchange, Gateway of India, and the slums of Dharavi.

The single-player story follows an Indian protagonist as a street gangster  Vangya the pickpocketer, doing pickpocketing with his friend Johnny, both want to make an name in this city that's why they join the Potya bhai's gang. The player can complete missions to progress an overall story, as well as engage in various side missions and activities.

Development 
The early stage of the game development approximately begins in 2015 according to the developer, the main phase begins following the announcement at IGDC in 2020 and the initial preview trailer was released in June 2021. In September 2021, the developers of the game got investment from Mumbai-based Angel investors for further development. In the IGDC Showcase of 2021, character models and alpha gameplay footage of the game was revealed. There are so many rumors about the Mumbai Gullies Android version. However, Thetechbook clarified that developers will only be working on PC/Consoles. In the same conference, the CEO of GameEon Studios and the producer of Mumbai Gullies, Nikhil Malankar revealed that the game would be released in two parts - Mumbai Gullies: Prologue and Mumbai Gullies: Final Chapter in 2023 and 2025 respectively.

Funding 
GameEon raised a total of ₹1,77,000/- through crowd funding for Mumbai Gullies. Mumbai Angels Network invested $320,000 in GameEon Studios.

Release 
In the IGDC Showcase 2021, Nikhil Malankar, the producer of the game announced that the game would be released in two parts - Mumbai Gullies: Prologue and Mumbai Gullies: Final Chapter that are set to be released in 2023 and 2025 respectively.

See also 

 Underworld Gang Wars (UGW)
 Indus Battle Royale

References

External links
GameEon Official Website

Upcoming video games scheduled for 2023
Upcoming video games scheduled for 2025
Action-adventure games
India-exclusive video games
Open-world video games
Organized crime video games
Third-person shooters
Video games developed in India
Video games set in India
Windows games
Windows-only games